Anne Alvaro (born 29 October 1951) is a French actress whose work spans from the early 1970s through to 2012. She is probably best known for her role as Eleonore in the 1983 biopic Danton.  She won one César Award for Best Actress in a Supporting Role for The Taste of Others in 2001 and another for The Clink of Ice in 2011.

Alvaro has also appeared in televised films, play adaptations, and series. In 2010, she appeared in a recurring role during the third season of the hit French TV drama, Engrenages.

Filmography

References

External links

  

French film actresses
French television actresses
Living people
1951 births
Best Supporting Actress César Award winners
People from Oran
Pieds-Noirs
20th-century French actresses
21st-century French actresses
Officiers of the Ordre des Arts et des Lettres